Peter Bieri (born 21 June 1952) is a Swiss politician. He was a member of the Council of States and served as the President of the Swiss Council of States for the 2006-2007 session.  He is a member of the Christian Democratic People's Party (CVP/PDC).

Bieri was born 1952 in Winterthur. He is married and father of four. From 1987 to 1994, he was member of the council of the municipality of Hünenberg.

Works 
 Bieri, Peter: Produktionstechnische und wirtschaftliche Untersuchungen über den Futteraufwand bei Milchkühen während der Laktation, Zürich, ETH, thesis 1982

External links
https://web.archive.org/web/20070311023351/http://www.peterbieri.ch/
Parliament.ch: Peter Bieri, Speaker of the Council of States 2006/2007 (CVP, ZG)

1952 births
Living people
People from Winterthur
Christian Democratic People's Party of Switzerland politicians
Members of the Council of States (Switzerland)
Presidents of the Council of States (Switzerland)